= Russo-German war =

Russo-German war may refer to:

- Eastern Front (World War I)
- Eastern Front (World War II)
